Westkapelle may refer to:

 Westkapelle, Belgium, a town in the municipality of Knokke-Heist in Belgium
 Westkapelle, Netherlands, a small city in the municipality of Veere in the Netherlands